Cru' In Action! is the only release by rap group C.I.A. (Cru' in Action!). The record has received more than one pressing by record companies Macola and Kru-Cut. Alonzo Williams was credited for executive production of the 12" single.  Personnel include Dr. Dre as producer and turntablist, as well as a then 17-year-old Ice Cube as writer and rapper.  The single was recorded in 1986 and released in 1987.

Track listing

Personnel

References

1987 singles
Ice Cube songs
Song recordings produced by Dr. Dre
Songs written by Ice Cube
1987 songs